Lexington Township is one of seven townships in Johnson County, Kansas, United States.  As of the 2010 census, its population was 1,312.

History

Potential Urban Development
After the closure of the Sunflower Army Ammunition Plant in 1992, plans for potential development of the 15.5 square mile lot (the largest single tract of land in the Kansas City Metropolitan Area, and the largest single urban redevelopment site in the United States) began to make rounds around locals, plans for an Oz Entertainment amusement park consumed seven futile years, after which the land was transferred to the Sunflower Redevelopment Group in 2005. At that time, about 3,700 acres were transferred clean, but much of that land was targeted for open space, buffer and parkland. Another plan that was set to open in 2002 was the newly announced Kansas Speedway and Kansas City Wizards stadiums. Recently, a master use plan has been adopted by the cities of Olathe, De Soto, the State of Kansas and Sunflower. The master plan calls for high density housing, major commercial zoning, a "downtown" area for offices, high density commercial and civic uses, and land promised to The University of Kansas, Kansas State University and the City of De Soto, as well as land being reserved for the army reserves, parks and other public spaces. However, the cleanup is expected to be completed by 2038. Recently, The Kansas City Star reported that Kansas state lawmakers urged the acceleration of cleanup efforts of the lot and announced that the northeastern portion of the plant, closest to De Soto, would be ready for light commercial and industrial development by 2020. It is speculated that the entire 15.5 square mile tract will be split for the three surrounding municipalities, those being Olathe, Gardner and De Soto. When completed, it is also speculated that the area will house over 25 thousand individuals as well as being a major tourism and historical center for Johnson County.

Cities
Unlike the neighboring Eudora Township, cities are not consolidated with the township. Instead cities are independent from the township and vice versa.

 De Soto
 Olathe

Unincorporated cities
 Cedar (former city, annexed by De Soto in 1998)
 Clearview City (former city, annexed by De Soto in 1998)
 Prairie Center (razed in 1941)
 De Soto Junction (former settlement, annexed by De Soto in 1998)
(This list is based on USGS data and may include former settlements.)

Adjacent Townships
 Sherman Township in Leavenworth (north)
 Delaware Township in Wyandotte County (northeast)
 Monticello Township in Johnson County (east)
 Olathe Township in Johnson County (southeast)
 Gardner Township in Johnson County (south)
 McCamish Township in Johnson County (southwest)
 Eudora Township in Douglas County (west)

Cemeteries
The township contains one cemetery: Prairie Center

Transportation

Major highways

Former Highways

Airports and landing strips
 Cedar Creek Aircenter

Emergency Services
 Johnson County Sheriff
 De Soto Fire Department

Rivers, Lakes, Streams
 Kansas River
 Kill Creek
 Camp Creek
 Cedar Creek
 Captain Creek
 Kill Creek Park North Lake
 Kill Creek Park South Lake
 Kill Creek Park Lake

Parks
 Kill Creek Park

De Soto
 Sunflower Nature Park
 De Soto Wilderness Park
 Kill Creek Streamway Park/Trail
 Mill Creek Rifle Club
 Lexington Lake Park

Olathe
 Timberridge Golf & Park

School districts
 Gardner USD 231
 De Soto USD 232
Eudora USD 491

References

External links

Townships in Johnson County, Kansas
Townships in Kansas